"Kernkraft 400" (English: Nuclear Energy 400) is a song performed by German techno artist Zombie Nation and the first single from their 1999 debut album Leichenschmaus. A remix of the SID track "Star Dust" by David Whittaker, from his 1984 Commodore 64 game Lazy Jones, it peaked at number 22 in Germany in February 2000 while becoming a top-10 hit in the Netherlands and Belgium's Flanders region a few months later. In September, the song debuted and peaked at number two on the UK Singles Chart, remaining there for two weeks, and has received a gold certification from the British Phonographic Industry (BPI) for sales and streams of at least 400,000 units.

The song, which is sometimes mislabeled as "Zombie Nation" (as the artist's name can be heard in the otherwise instrumental track), is commonly used as a sports chant at sport stadiums (such as in American football, Association football, baseball, basketball, and hockey) all over the world and was ranked number eight by Sports Illustrated in their list of "Top 10 Stadium Anthems".

Though permission for the sampling was not initially granted, Whittaker was paid an undisclosed sum from Florian Senfter

Release
"Kernkraft 400" was released in Germany by Gigolo Records in 1999. The single was released in the United Kingdom on 18 September 2000 by Data Records.

Music video
The music video of "Kernkraft 400" starts out inside a nuclear power plant room where an infomercial host (Florian Senfter) dressed in '70s disco clothing comes out and later two models (Cindy and Mindy) come onto scene dancing. One model puts a plate of food into a trademarked Kernkraft 400™ microwave oven, which cooks the food much faster and hotter than the other model's conventional microwave oven. Mindy then gets into a standard tanning bed, while Cindy waits before getting into a Kernkraft 400™. Mindy reveals a sunburnt tan, while Cindy has a perfect sun tan which has even worked under her beachwear. Finally, the host sits on a couch in the studio, off camera, where he examines a standard vibrator and a Kernkraft 400™ version. As the camera pulls away, both women are seen running towards the host while the video production staff are seen wearing hazmat suits.

The video was produced and directed by Hendrik Hölzemann, Grischa Schmitz and Dominique Schuchman who at that time were studying film at the Filmacademy Ludwigsburg, under the name Panic Pictures.

Reception
Select gave the single a review noting its widespread popularity stating that it was "as welcome in Pacha as in the Munich underpass, Tongo and Coxo like this Teutonic techno," as well as noting it was "Not bad for a couple of DJs called Splank and Mooner".

In the liner notes of the Kiss mix album Kiss House Nation 2001, Mixmag music editor Matthew Kershaw named the song among 2000's "uncategorisable" club tracks, noting it "was championed everywhere from children's television to the most underground techno clubs. Was it techno, trance, electro or house? No-one knew, and frankly, no one cared."

In popular culture
"Kernkraft 400" first received US radio airplay on now defunct station Energy 92.7 & 5 in Chicago, Illinois in 2001.  Due to its popularity with all ages on that station it was first introduced to sports fans at Chicago Rush arena football games.  The song was not a featured song during player introductions but received regular play during timeouts and commercial breaks to assist in keeping the indoor American Football fans loud and aroused at the team's home field at Allstate Arena in suburban Rosemont, Il.

"Kernkraft 400" has been sampled by various artists, including rapper The Game in the single "Red Nation". The song is used by the Boston Bruins and Milwaukee Admirals, who both play it at home games after a goal is scored. The Bruins have been using it ever since the song was originally released. The Toronto Maple Leafs used the song at home games after a goal was scored from 1999 to 2013. It grew in popularity within the hockey community during the 2011, 2013, and 2019 Stanley Cup Playoffs when the Bruins had three deep runs. The Pittsburgh Steelers have played this song pre-game kickoff since before 2010. The Seattle Mariners also play the song after a big hit or during rallies at T-Mobile Park. The Los Angeles Dodgers play the song after a home run. Penn State football has been using "Kernkraft 400" since as early as 2005. During the break in the song, fans chant "We Are Penn State." The song became a semi-official anthem for Welsh football fans during their country's qualification campaign for UEFA Euro 2016. This stems from an incident after their 0–0 draw with Belgium at Stade Roi Baudouin in Brussels, in which the travelling Welsh fans danced enthusiastically to the song being played over the stadium's public address system. As a result, the song was played before the return fixture at Cardiff City Stadium on 12 June 2015.

Tranmere Rovers also use the theme track before the players come out to get the crowd roaring. In the NBA, most teams used this song as their starting lineup music or hype music. One good example is in Oklahoma City using it in the 2018 NBA Playoffs Game 2 versus the Utah Jazz.

The UCF Knights began using "Kernkraft 400" as their rallying anthem at least as early as 2007 with the opening of FBC Mortgage Stadium. When the song plays, UCF fans jump chanting "U-C-F Knights" during the breaks in the song. The song became controversial on campus as it became a cue for fans to start jumping, which when done in unison makes the stadium reverberate and bounce, earning it the nickname, "The Bounce House". University officials originally wanted to stop playing the song all together for the longevity of the built stadium, but after safety inspections showed no structural damage, they instead settled on playing shorter clips of the song fewer times during a game. 

Yasuaki Yamasaki who plays for Yokohama DeNA Baystars, Japan's Central League, uses "Kernkraft 400" as an intro song when he takes the mound with so-called fans' Yasuaki-Jump in Japan. 

"Kernkraft 400" is featured in the soundtrack of the 2012 video game NHL 13, which uses the "Stadium Chant Mix" version. 

The New Jersey Devils used "Kernkraft 400" as a goal song in their first year during the 2007-08 season at the Prudential Center in Newark, New Jersey.

Atlanta United FC of Major League Soccer uses this song when they score a goal. 

The Atlanta Braves play this song when they win.

The Real Valladolid play this song when they score.
Celtic play this song when they score or win in the Glasgow Derby at home.

In Italy, A.C. Milan of Serie A uses this song when they score a goal.

In the Netherlands, PSV Eindhoven of the Eredivisie uses this song when they score a goal.

On May 8, 2022 W268BB 101.5 in State College, Pennsylvania launched the station by playing this song over and over for a week.

Charts

Weekly charts

Year-end charts

Certifications

"Kernkraft 400 (A Better Day)" 
On 17 June 2022, German DJ Topic and Swedish singer A7S released the cover "Kernkraft 400 (A Better Day)." The song charted at 26 on the German chart.

References

External links
The Story of the Biggest Sports Stadium Hit: "Kernkraft 400" by Zombie Nation - VICE Video

1999 debut singles
1999 songs
Boston Bruins
Electronic songs
Football songs and chants
Los Angeles Dodgers
Number-one singles in Greece
Seattle Mariners
UCF Knights football